Motlalepula Mofolo (born 7 September 1986) is a Mosotho footballer who currently plays for Lioli Teyateyaneng.

International career
Since 2007, Mofolo has won five caps for the Lesotho national football team. He played in his first World Cup qualifying match on 15 June 2008, coming on as a substitute for Sello Muso in the 0–1 defeat at home to Libya.

References

Association football midfielders
Lesotho footballers
Lesotho international footballers
1986 births
Living people
Lesotho expatriate footballers
Lesotho expatriate sportspeople in South Africa
Expatriate soccer players in South Africa
Orlando Pirates F.C. players
Expatriate footballers in Algeria
MC Saïda players